Acacia spectrum, also known as Kimberley ghost wattle, is a shrub of the genus Acacia and the subgenus Plurinerves that is endemic to arid parts of north western Australia.

Description
It has glabrous branchlets with caducous stipules that are often covered in a fine white and powdery coating. Like most species of Acacia it has phyllodes rather than true leaves.

Taxonomy
The species was first formally named as Acacia spectra by the botanists Margaret A. Lewington and Bruce Maslin in 2009 as a part of the work Three new species of Acacia (Leguminosae: Mimosoideae) from the Kimberley Region, Western Australia as published in the journal Nuytsia.
The holotype was collected in 2005 below sandstone cliffs along the Mitchell River. It grew abundantly in shrubland habitat with Acacia deltoidea, Acacia kelleri, and Grevillea cunninghamii.

Distribution

See also
 List of Acacia species

References

spectrum
Acacias of Western Australia
Plants described in 2009
Taxa named by Bruce Maslin